Inventive spelling (sometimes invented spelling)  is the use of unconventional spellings of words.

Conventional written English is not phonetic (that is, it is not written as it sounds, due to the history of its spelling, which led to outdated, unintuitive, misleading or arbitrary spelling conventions and spellings of individual words) unlike, for example, German or Spanish, where letters have relatively fixed associated sounds, so that the written text is a fair representation of the spoken words.

Overview 
English spelling is not intuitive and must be learned.  There have been numerous proposals to rationalize written English, notably by 
 Noah Webster in the early 19th century (which is why the Webster's Dictionary used in the US varies from the British Oxford English Dictionary) 
 Sir Isaac Pitman, inventor of Pitman shorthand about 1838, which uses symbols to represent sounds, and words are, for the most part, written as they are spoken
 Dr. John R. Malone invented Unifon in the mid-1950s 
 Sir James Pitman (the grandson of Sir Isaac) in the early 1960s developed the Initial Teaching Alphabet
 Jaber Jabbour in 2012 proposed SaypU, an abbreviated version of the International Phonetic Alphabet adapted for tourism and safety notices, which uses only part of the Latin alphabet

In education
Inventive spelling for children may be encouraged or discouraged by teachers and parents who may believe that expression is more important than accurate orthography or conversely that a failure to correct may lead to difficulty in communicating more complex ideas in later life.

Inventive spelling programs may also be known as "words their way" in some schools' curricula.
Critics of inventive spelling  have argued that inventive spelling does not produce superior writing skills.

Debate over inventive or invented spelling 
Samuel Orton pioneered the study of learning disabilities, such as dyslexia. where the subject is apt to confound the letter-order of words. He and  his assistant Anna Gillingham, an educator and psychologist, evolved the Orton-Gillingham Approach to reading instruction which is language-based, multi-sensory, structured, sequential, cumulative, cognitive, and flexible. The Academy of Orton-Gillingham Practitioners and Educators (AOEPE) lists about a dozen schools currently committed to this controversial method, which has evolved since about 1935.

More recently, Uta Frith, a developmental psychologist at the Institute of Cognitive Neuroscience at University College, London, has published work concerning spelling difficulties and dyslexia.

Dyslexia, whether linked to complex spelling or not, may offer considerable potential for human development.

Learning theory

Whether an individual accepts or rejects inventive spelling is a feature of that individual's theory of learning. The debate is closely linked with the debate over whole language literacy instruction and phonics instruction.

Theories of supporters
Those who favor inventive spelling tend to believe in constructivism, a theoretical perspective on learning (an epistemology) grounded in postmodernism and holism.  Constructivists believe that knowledge is created by individuals in a social context.  Because knowledge is cultural, there are no right answers.  In terms of inventive spelling, constructivists are likely to believe that the child is inventing spellings in accord with his or her understanding of language and print.  These spellings are neither right nor wrong; they reflect the child's development as a speller.

Theories of detractors
Those who oppose inventive spelling tend to be positivists or post-positivists. Positivists believe that there are correct answers that we can discover based upon empirical observation. They would argue that encouraging inventive spelling is not helpful because there are correct ways to spell that children should learn.

Post-positivists believe that while we cannot know truth completely – our own biases and perspectives prevent that – we can approximate truth.  Post-positivists might agree with constructivists that an inventive spelling does reflect a child's development but might also argue that there are socially accepted spellings and that children should know these well. This side of the debate was explored further in the book and short film "The deliberate dumbing down of America".

State of the debate
Advocates of inventive spelling focus on creativity when children are first learning to spell and write, feel this preserves self-esteem, and thus, feel creativity in spelling is most important.  Opponents counter that creativity is a distraction when learning spelling for the first time, and that children ought to be taught accurate spelling as soon as possible so as not to have incorrect spellings become a habit and delay the learning of accurate spelling.  The overwhelming view from parents  is that children learn to spell more quickly and accurately if accurate spelling is the focus instead of creativity when learning words.  Accuracy as the focus in spelling is the manner used in conventional teaching methods and was effectively universal prior to the implementation of 1970s school reform involving whole word literacy and "new math". 4

Instruction

Inventive spelling instruction
Pedagogical concepts   are based on research studies of early literacy, e.g. by  Emilia Ferreiro & Ana Teberosky, Maryann Manning and others. Children are encouraged to learn to read by writing in a meaningful context, e.g. by writing letters to others. To write a word they have to decompose its spoken form into sounds and then to translate them into letters, e.g. k, a, t for the phonemes /k/, /æ/, and /t/. Empirical studies  show that later orthographic development is fostered rather than hindered by these invented spellings - as long as children from the beginning are confronted with "book spellings", too.

To use SIL International's inventive spelling program, there are several instructional principles, as follows: 
 At first, the teachers should accept all of the student's writing as meaningful writing. As students gain more experience, they begin to learn the correct spellings of words and use these spellings in their writings.
 Let the students write freely and independently.
 Ask students to read what they have written.
 Read the text, or repeat the story as if you are reading it.
 Ignore spelling and grammar errors, unless the students ask to be corrected.
 Rewrite the text if students want you to.
 Help the students to create their own word lists as they write or edit so they can find out the proper spellings.

One aspect of inventive spelling rarely discussed by its advocates is the toll it takes on teachers' time.  Recent studies suggest that to be effective a spelling teacher also must correctly guess what words children meant to use when they invent spellings. The possible deductions are numerous and potentially complicated.4

Instruction for conventional spelling

Writing and reading are complex cognitive processes of encoding and decoding symbols, of which spelling forms only part.  "Look and say" form an image of a word without spelling.  Spelling training may require children to write out lists of words repeatedly, or engage in competitive spelling bee tests. Such methods of instruction do not tend to improve students' understanding of the relationship between spelling and pronunciation on any words except those prescribed.

Instruction that emphasizes conventional spelling focuses on the phonics patterns and rules in English which are anyway intrinsically weak because of the complexity of the history of the English language.  For example, children can be taught that when they hear the  sound at the end of a one-syllable word where a short vowel precedes the sound, the  sound will be spelled ck (as in stack, wreck, stick, rock, and stuck).  A similar pattern holds for the  sound spelled dge (as in badge, wedge, bridge, lodge, and budge) and the  sound spelling tch.

The same is also applicable for the process of learning acronyms. It is acceptable to use the inventive spelling of GBOL or Jeebol which can in turn be written as Jeeball.

Once children learn these phonics patterns, they can apply them to words.  When children make errors, the teacher does not merely tell them they are wrong; the teacher, to the extent possible, returns the child's attention to the relevant rule or pattern.

There are also sight words that do not follow patterns; children need to memorize conventional spellings for these words, such as who.

Benefits and costs

Benefits

Whether teachers encourage children to use inventive spellings or not, analyzing them has several key advantages:
 Children's invented spellings help teachers understand what students know and do not know about the phonetic structure of the language.
 Sophisticated spelling, even if it is not conventional, may indicate strong phonological awareness.
 Examining invented spellings may help researchers understand the development of phonological awareness and understanding of sound-symbol correspondences.

For those teachers who emphasize constructivist, inventive spellings, there are further advantages:
 Children who are allowed to spell inventively may learn an earlier appreciation for writing.
 Children who spell inventively may be more creative in their writing because they focus less on form. They may also use more complicated and precise words that occur in their oral vocabulary but that they do not yet know how to spell, helping them communicate their ideas more fully.

The above two suppositions on the benefits of inventive spelling have not been empirically verified and are not generally accepted by neurolinguists, who study the natural learning process of spoken language and have recently determined that reading and spelling are not "hard-wired", natural processes.

Costs
Permitting or encouraging children to spell inventively has some costs.
 According to some research, children may learn to spell correctly faster if they are taught to do so in a direct and systematic way.
 Encouraging inventive spelling may delay children's conventional spelling development.
 Early excitement about writing may give way to later frustration when students feel a lack of confidence about their misspellings.
 Some students like to spell things correctly and may resist attempts to get them to spell inventively.
 Practising bad spelling habits ingrains them and makes them difficult to overcome, while spelling correctly from the beginning eliminates this problem.

References

 http://www.sil.org/lingualinks/literacy/ReferenceMaterials/GlossaryOfLiteracyTerms/WhatIsInventiveSpelling.htm—SIL International
 http://www.germantownacademy.org/academics/ls/K/spelling/spelling.htm—Germantown Academy Kindergarten
 http://www.nrrf.org/42_invented_spelling.html—National Right to Read Foundation
 quoted from Dr. Patrick Groff, NRRF Board Member & Senior Advisor

Teaching
Nonstandard spelling